Virginia Fields (born November 30, 1945) represented the 5th District in the New York State Assembly, which includes parts of the Long Island towns of Brookhaven and Islip, including Centereach, Farmingville, Fire Island, Holbrook, Holtsville, Lake Ronkonkoma, Selden, Bayport, Bohemia, Oakdale, Ronkonkoma, Sayville, and West Sayville.

Career
Fields was chosen to represent this district in a special election held on March 9, 2004, due to incumbent Steve Levy's resignation to become Suffolk County Executive. She was re-elected in 2006 and again in 2008, when she defeated Republican opponent John Bugler. In September 2010, she lost the Democratic primary race to Ken Mangan. Fields ran in the 2010 general election on the Independence and Working Families party lines, but was defeated by Republican Al Graf.
 
Fields previously served as a lawmaker in the Suffolk County Legislature (2000–2003), where she chaired the Health Committee. Prior to her election to the legislature she served as a health care administrator for 37 years.

In 2015, Fields left the Democratic Party and registered as a Republican.

Personal life
Fields resides in Oakdale, New York. She and her husband Walter have two grown sons.

References

External links

1945 births
Living people
Democratic Party members of the New York State Assembly
Politicians from Suffolk County, New York
Women state legislators in New York (state)
People from Oakdale, New York
21st-century American politicians
21st-century American women politicians